Mucus plug may refer to:
 plugging of the bronchioles by mucus
Cervical mucus plug